Gangster Returns is a 2015 Bangladeshi action thriller film directed by Ashiqur Rahman and features Ziaul Faruq Apurba in lead role. The development began in January, 2013.

Cast
 Ziaul Faruq Apurba as Shaon, a gangster
 Peya Jannatul 
 Prabir Mitra
 Khaleda Akter Kolpona
 Tiger Robi
 Shampa Hasnain
 Robiul Islam

References

Further reading
 
 
 

2015 films
2015 action thriller films
Bengali-language Bangladeshi films
Bangladeshi action thriller films
Bangladeshi gangster films
2010s Bengali-language films